Copris minutus, the small black dung beetle, is a species of dung beetle in the family Scarabaeidae. It is found in North America.

References

Further reading

 

Coprini
Articles created by Qbugbot
Beetles described in 1773
Taxa named by Dru Drury